Longoonops is a genus of spiders in the family Oonopidae. It was first described in 2010 by Platnick & Dupérré. , it contains 6 species.

Species
Longoonops comprises the following species:
Longoonops bicolor Platnick & Dupérré, 2010
Longoonops chickeringi Platnick & Dupérré, 2010
Longoonops ellae Platnick, Dupérré & Berniker, 2013
Longoonops gorda Platnick & Dupérré, 2010
Longoonops noctucus (Chickering, 1969)
Longoonops padiscus (Chickering, 1969)

References

Oonopidae
Araneomorphae genera
Spiders of the Caribbean
Spiders of Central America